Macbridea caroliniana is a species of flowering plant in the mint family known by the common names Carolina birds-in-a-nest and Carolina bogmint. It one of only two species in the genus Macbridea, and though distributed over a wider range than Macbridea alba, apparently still quite rare. It occurs in swamp forests of the Atlantic coastal plain, and is documented in North Carolina, South Carolina, and Georgia, though undocumented reports exist for Florida, Alabama, and Mississippi.

References

External links
USDA Plants Profile

Lamiaceae